The 28th Division was one of the divisions of the Spanish Republican Army that were organized during the Spanish Civil War on the basis of the Mixed Brigades. It was deployed on the Aragon and Segre fronts.

History 
The unit was created in April 1937 from the old Ascaso Column, commanded by the anarchist Gregorio Jover. The new 28th Division, in addition to the forces coming from the «Ascaso» column, had also absorbed the remains of other militia forces and became composed of 125th, 126th and 127th mixed brigades; continued under Jover's command.

The 28th Division remained on the Aragon front for much of the war. In June 1937 it took part in the unsuccessful Huesca Offensive, and at the end of August one of its units - the 127th MB - took part in the Zaragoza Offensive. In February 1938 it took part in the Battle of Alfambra. During the subsequent offensive on the Aragon front, the unit undertook several withdrawals in the face of enemy pressure. It took part in the Levante Offensive integrated in the 13th Army Corps, being later transferred to the Estremadura front, where it participated in the Battle of Merida pocket. After Gregorio Jover was promoted to command of the 10th Army Corps, on August 11 Juan Mayordomo Moreno took command of the division. In January 1939, the unit participated in the Battle of Valsequillo, integrated into the Toral Group.

Commanders 
Commanders
 Gregorio Jover;
 Juan Mayordomo Moreno

Commissars
 Adolfo Arnal García;
 Pedro Fernández Alonso

Chief of Staff
 Ramón Rodríguez Bosmediano

Battles

See also 
 Spanish Republican Army
 List of Spanish Republican divisions

References

Bibliography 
 
 
 
 
 
 
 
 
 
 
 

Military units and formations established in 1937
Military units and formations disestablished in 1939
Divisions of Spain
Military units and formations of the Spanish Civil War
Military history of Spain
Armed Forces of the Second Spanish Republic
Militarized anarchist formations